General Richard Matthews (d. 1783) was a soldier who fought with the Army of the East India Company. He fought in the Second Anglo-Mysore War (1780-84).

Bednore
After initial successes in seizing the forts of Rajamundroog and Mirjan (Merjee) before moving on and taking Honnavar (Onore). Matthews was ordered to advance on Bednore. Following the death of Hyder Ali, the commander of Bednore, Hyat Sahib, the Mysore commander had learnt that Tipu Sultan intended to remove him from command, surrendered to Matthews.

References

1783 deaths